The Denshawai incident is the name given to a dispute which occurred in 1906 between British Army officers and locals in Denshawai, Egypt. It is considered by some historians, such as Peter Mansfield who wrote The British in Egypt (1971), to mark a turning point in the British presence in that country. Though the incident itself was fairly small in terms of the number of casualties and injuries, the British officers' response to the incident, and the significant consequences, were what led to its lasting impact.  The incident was commemorated by the establishment of the Denshway Museum.

Causes
There were many tensions that led up to the Denshawai incident. The Egyptian people had had a growing sense of nationalism long before the British occupation of Egypt in 1882 and the revolt of Ahmed Urabi. The Urabi Revolt was motivated by the idea of revolution and liberation of the Egyptian people from their Turkish overlords; it led to the Anglo-Egyptian War. The Egyptian government was taken over and directed by Evelyn Baring, 1st Earl of Cromer. He was in charge of economic reforms and worked to eliminate the debt caused by the Ottoman khedival regime. The success of these reforms was mainly enjoyed by the upper classes.

Since the khedival regime, the upper classes benefited from the British occupation and its abundant success. The middle class was the primary group in Egypt to resist the British occupation. They criticized the British for not dealing with the khedival government's corruption. Positions in the Egyptian government were filled by the British officers. Newspaper writers maintained that, if not for the policies of the British government in Egypt, those positions could have been easily filled by capable, educated Egyptians.

Incident

On 13 June 1906, a group of British Army officers were hunting pigeons for sport around the village of Denshawai. The villagers became upset due to the fact that the pigeons were cultivated by them as a source of food and also due to the fact that it puts their crops at risk of catching fire. A scuffle broke out, and one of the British officers fired his gun, wounding a female villager and eventually killing her, which provoked further attack upon the officers. 

One of the officers managed to escape from the scene and fled back on foot towards the British camp in the intense noontime heat. He later collapsed outside the camp and died, most likely of heatstroke. A villager who came upon him there tried to assist and help him, but when other soldiers from the camp saw the villager alongside the body of the dead officer, they assumed that he had killed the officer, and killed him in turn, the soldiers that killed the villager were later stabbed by an Egyptian teenager.

British response
Concerned about the growing Egyptian nationalist sentiments, officials decided to respond to the Denshawai Incident. The next day, the British Army arrived, arresting fifty-two men in the village (identified as members of the involved scuffle) including Abd-el-Nebi, Hassan Mahfouz, a man called Darweesh, and Zahran. At a summary trial, with both Egyptian and British judges, responsibility for the incident was determined. Hassan, Darweesh, Zahran, and one other man, were convicted of murdering the officer who had died of heatstroke, with the claim that their actions had put him in that deadly position. They were sentenced to death. One of the judges was Boutros Ghali. Abd-el-Nebi and another villager were given life sentences of penal servitude; twenty-six villagers were given various terms of hard labour and ordered to be flogged. The officers claimed that they had been "guests" of the villagers and had done nothing deliberately wrong.

Hassan was hanged in front of his own house in front of his family, which was uncharacteristic of the usual protocol in capital punishment. This decision sparked outrage among the Egyptian public and was described by the nationalist press as being especially cruel and an "outright symbol of tyranny".

Darweesh's last words from the gallows were: “May God compensate us well for this world of meanness, for this world of injustice, for this world of cruelty.”

Consequences
Concerned with growing Egyptian nationalism, British officials thought it best to show their strength and make an example of the villager leaders involved. Many were arrested, and four charged with murder. This decision inflamed Egyptian nationalist sentiment. Some Egyptian leaders later affirmed that the incident, and the British response to it, led them to suppose that co-operation with the British Empire was "totally unacceptable" and impossible. The belief that co-operation was impossible increased leaders' concerns about British pressure to widen the franchise in Egypt, and caused them to push harder for the removal of British forces from Egypt.

In the long run, this incident, along with the rise in Egyptian nationalism, led to an anti-colonial struggle in Egypt during World War I. During the war, the Egyptian Expeditionary Force was stationed in Egypt. Its presence resulted in the major expenditure of food and resources to fight the Ottoman Empire. This had been a long time goal of Egyptian nationalists. As the war continued, the unrest sparked by the Denshawai incident was further aggravated by inflation, as well as food shortages in the country; severely damaging the Egyptian economy.

By 1919, Egypt was ripe for revolt. While the Allies were attempting to reach a post-war agreement, the Egyptian leaders, known as the Wafd, which later gave its name to the major political party, were denied entrance to France to meet with the Versailles peacemakers. Among other things, the Wafd wanted a greater share in the Anglo-Egyptian Sudan, Egypt's joint colony with Britain. The Versailles refusal led to most of the Egyptian government resigning, and resulted in mass demonstrations, which led to riots. These riots, and the grievances that triggered them, provided Egyptian nationalists with both a focus for unified action, and a base of support that was wider than any they had attracted in the prewar decades.

This decision was used by national and anti-foreign elements to inflame public opinion in Egypt. Britons who called the tribunal and its legality into question, were accused of being unpatriotic and supporting the “venal agitators” in Egypt.

Guy Aldred, who in 1907 compared the execution of Madan Lal Dhingra with the immunity given to the British officers in this incident, was sentenced to twelve months' hard labour for publishing The Indian Sociologist.

George Bernard Shaw, in the preface to his play John Bull's Other Island, gave the public more of his view of the incident. In a passage more noted for its picturesque description than for its literal accuracy, he stated: 

He then went on in the same vein:

Legacy
Fifty years later, the Egyptian journalist Mohamed Hassanein Heikal said "the pigeons of Denshawai have come home to roost", to describe the aftermath of the Anglo-French strikes in Egypt in 1956.

"The Hanging of Zahran" is a poem by Salah Abdel Sabour about the incident. Nagui Riad made the film Friend of Life, based on the poem.

"27 June 1906, 2:00 pm" is a related poem by Constantine P. Cavafy, that starts: "When the Christians took and hanged/ the innocent boy of seventeen/ his mother who there beside the scaffold/ had dragged herself..."

The incident is mentioned in Ken Follett's 1980 spy novel The Key to Rebecca, set in Egypt.

See also
 Denshway Museum
 Ahmad Fathy Zaghlul

References

Bibliography
 By Keith David Watenpaugh
 Fahmy, Ziad. Ordinary Egyptians: Creating the Modern Nation through Popular Culture. Stanford, CA: Stanford University Press, 2011.

1906 in Egypt
History of Egypt (1900–present)
British Empire
Egypt–United Kingdom relations
Conflicts in 1906
1906 in the British Empire
Rebellions against the British Empire
Monufia Governorate